Kyauktaw Township is a township of Mrauk-U District in the Rakhine State of Myanmar. The principal town is Kyauktaw.

Townships of Rakhine State